Greg Young is an American basketball coach who was most recently the head coach of the UT Arlington Mavericks men's basketball team.

Playing career
A three-sport athlete in high school, Young played college basketball at Howard Payne University where he was a four-year letterman and senior captain.

Coaching career
After graduating from college in 1986, Young would spend the next four years as an assistant coach at Texas Wesleyan before returning to his hometown as an assistant at Cleburne High School for a single season. He returned to the college ranks as an assistant at Eastern New Mexico before landing his first head coaching job at Lamar Community College in Colorado. After four seasons with the Runnin' Lopes, Young took the head coaching position at Hill College where he stayed for two seasons before becoming an assistant coach and recruiting coordinator at Texas State for Dennis Nutt. Young would return to the junior college ranks to take the head coaching position at Jacksonville College where he'd lead the team to one of its best records in school history with a 21–10 record during the 2008–09 season, and would be honored as Region XIV Coach of the Year. Overall, Young would compile a 168–139 record across his head coaching stops at the junior and community college level.

In 2009, Scott Cross would hire Young as an assistant coach at UT Arlington. As an assistant, Young was part of the Mavericks' 2012 NIT squad as well as the 2016 Sun Belt regular season title winners and 2017 NIT quarterfinalist team. After Scott's firing, Young was retained by Chris Ogden.

After Ogden departed for an assistant coaching position at Texas, UT Arlington elevated Young to the head coaching position on April 5, 2021, making him the 9th head coach in program history.

Head coaching record

NCAA D1

References

Living people
Year of birth missing (living people)
American men's basketball coaches
UT Arlington Mavericks men's basketball coaches
Howard Payne Yellow Jackets men's basketball players
Texas State Bobcats men's basketball coaches
Eastern New Mexico Greyhounds men's basketball coaches
People from Cleburne, Texas
Basketball coaches from Texas
Basketball players from Texas